Teleșeu is a village in Orhei District, Moldova.

Notable people
 Vladimir Cristi

References

Villages of Orhei District